Helen Quigley is a former Irish Social Democratic and Labour Party politician from Derry in Northern Ireland.

She had been a member (for the Northland District Electoral Area) of Derry City Council since 2001 and the Mayor of Derry in 2006–07. She was awarded the Freedom of the City of London on 6 February 2007.

Helen Quigley was an unsuccessful SDLP candidate for the Foyle constituency in the 2007 Northern Ireland Assembly elections, but remained as SDLP leader on Derry City Council.

In November 2010 she confirmed that she would not contest elections in May 2011 and the SDLP announced that she was leaving public life. She resigned as SDLP leader on Derry City Council but would remain a member of the party.

References

Year of birth missing (living people)
Living people
Mayors of Derry
Social Democratic and Labour Party politicians
Women mayors of places in Northern Ireland